The Algerian Cross Country Championships is an annual cross country running competition that serves as Algeria's national championship for the sport. The main races on the programme are a men's and a women's long course race. Short course races for men and women have been held historically, but not since 2006.

The most successful athlete of the competition is Nasria Baghdad-Azaïdj, who won eight national titles in the women's long race between 1995 and 2004, as well as three further titles in the short race. Khoudir Aggoune is the most successful man, having won three long course titles and four short course titles between 2002 and 2009. Rabah Aboud and Yahia Azaidj have both won the men's long race on four occasions. Kenza Dahmani is a seven-time women's long course champion, while Mebarka Hadj Abdellah has six.

Past senior race winners

References

List of winners
National Crosscountry Champions for Algeria. Association of Road Racing Statisticians. Retrieved 2018-02-26.
Algerian Championships. GBR Athletics. Retrieved 2018-02-26.

Athletics competitions in Algeria
National cross country running competitions
Annual sporting events in Algeria
Cross country running in Algeria
Cross Country